The year 1976 in architecture involved some significant architectural events and new buildings.

Events
 October 4 – Tax Reform Act of 1976 in the United States is signed into law, establishing tax incentives designed to encourage the preservation of historic structures.

Buildings and structures

Buildings completed and opened

 October – Wotruba Church (Kirche Zur Heiligsten Dreifaltigkeit) in Vienna, to a design by Fritz Wotruba, completed.
 October 1 – CN Tower in Toronto, Ontario, Canada, designed by WZMH Architects and John Andrews, opened.
 October 25 – Royal National Theatre on London's South Bank, designed by Denys Lasdun, opened.
 November 26 – The OCBC Centre in Singapore, designed by I. M. Pei & Partners, completed.
 John Hancock Tower in Boston, Massachusetts, designed by Henry N. Cobb of I. M. Pei & Partners.
 Scotia Centre (Calgary) in Calgary, Alberta.
 Federal Reserve Bank in Boston, Massachusetts, designed by Hugh Stubbins & Associates, is completed.
 Home Office building at 50 Queen Anne's Gate (now 102 Petty France), Westminster, London, designed by Basil Spence.
 Guildhall Library, Guildhall, London (City), designed by Richard Gilbert Scott, completed.
 Salters' Hall in the City of London, designed by Sir Basil Spence.
 Water Tower Place in Chicago, Illinois, designed by Edward D. Dart of Loebl Schlossman Bennett and Dart.
 Fernmeldeturm Koblenz near Koblenz in Germany.
 El Parque de la Marca Hispanica, Le Perthus, on the French/Spanish border, designed by Ricardo Bofill Taller de Arquitectura, completed.
 Ponte City Apartments in Johannesburg, South Africa, designed by Mannie Feldman.
 ABSA Tower in Johannesburg.
 First planned residential development at South Woodham Ferrers in England.
 Hopkins House, Hampstead, London, designed by Michael and Patty Hopkins as a home and architectural studio for themselves.
 The Round House (bungalow) at Stoke Canon in England, designed by Peter Blundell Jones and Gillian Smith.
 The replacement replica Kaohsiung Confucius Temple is built in Taiwan.
 Młotek in Warsaw, Poland, designed by Jan Bogusławski and Bohdan Gniewiewski.

Awards
 Architecture Firm Award – Mitchell/Giurgola Architects
 Grand prix national de l'architecture – Roger Taillibert
 Rome Prize for architecture – Gunnar Birkerts
 RAIA Gold Medal – Harry Seidler
 RIBA Royal Gold Medal – John Summerson
 Twenty-five Year Award – 860–880 Lake Shore Drive Apartments

Births
 1976 – Ott Kadarik, Estonian architect
 date unknown – Antonio Pio Saracino, Italian-born US architect

Deaths
 January 26 – Eric Francis, British architect and painter (born 1887)
 May 11 – Alvar Aalto, Finnish architect, designer, sculptor and painter (born 1898)
 November 19 – Sir Basil Spence, Scottish Modernist/Brutalist architect (born 1907)
 Nugent Cachemaille-Day, English ecclesiastical architect (born 1896)

References

 
20th-century architecture